Devarampally is a village and panchayat in Jayashankar Bhupalpally district, Telangana, India. It falls under Kataram mandal.

References

Villages in Jayashankar Bhupalpally district